McMinnville School District, also known as McMinnville SD 40, is a public school district in Yamhill County, Oregon, United States. It provides primary and secondary education for the cities of McMinnville and Lafayette.

As of October, 2014, it includes nine schools, with 709 employees and 6,638 students in six elementary schools, two middle schools, and one high school. On average, teachers have 13.5 years of experience, with 80% holding master's degrees.

Demographics
2013-14 Total Enrollment: 6,638 (October 2014)

Elementary schools (K-5): 3,021
Middle schools (6-8): 1,545
High school (9-12): 2,072
Schools: 9

McMinnville High School (MHS) is a comprehensive high school that serves students in grades 9-12.
MHS includes two satellite campuses: Cook Alternative School and the Engineering and Aerospace Sciences Academy (EASA).

Special Education students: 12.6%
English Language Learners: 14.2%
Student Demographics (2013-14 data)

African American: 1%
American Indian/Alaska Native: 1%
Asian/Pacific Islander: 1.9%
Hispanic/Latino: 33.1%
White: 62.6%

Parents may identify with more than one demographic category, producing totals greater than 100%.

Schools

Elementary schools
Sue Buel Elementary
Columbus Elementary 
Grandhaven Elementary 
Memorial Elementary 
Newby Elementary
Wascher Elementary

Middle schools
Duniway Middle School
Patton Middle School

High schools
McMinnville High School
Engineering Aerospace Sciences Academy

References

External links

Oregon Department of Education School District Report Cards 2013-2014

School districts in Oregon
McMinnville, Oregon
Education in Yamhill County, Oregon